Lejzor Ilia (also "Ilja") Szrajbman (April 25, 1907 – 1943) was a Polish Olympic freestyle swimmer. In 1935, he was the Polish 400m freestyle champion. He competed in the 1935 Maccabiah Games in Mandatory Palestine, and for Poland at the 1936 Summer Olympics in Berlin, Germany. In 1938, he won a gold medal in the Polish 4x200m relay freestyle championship.  Szrajbman was murdered in 1943 in the Majdanek concentration camp.

Biography
Szrajbman was born in Warsaw, Poland. His parents were Lejzor and Masha. He attended Waclaw Szwedkowski Boys Junior High School in Siedlce, Poland. He served as an officer in the Polish 9th Light Artillery Regiment.

He was a Jewish Academic Sports Association and Legia swimmer. In 1935, Szrajbman won the Polish 400m freestyle championship.

Szrajbman was Jewish, and competed in the 1935 Maccabiah Games in Mandatory Palestine.

He competed for Poland at the 1936 Summer Olympics in the men's 4 × 200 metres freestyle relay in Berlin, Germany.

In 1938, Szrajbman won a gold medal in the Polish 4x200m relay freestyle championship.

In August 1939, Szrajbman was competing in the 1939 International University Games in Monte Carlo, but left the competition and went to Poland to fight the Germans with the Polish 30th Kani Rifle Regiment upon the outbreak of the September 1939 Invasion of Poland. He later fought in the 1943 Warsaw Ghetto Uprising.

Szrajbman was murdered in 1943 in the Majdanek concentration camp.

See also
List of select Jewish swimmers

References

1907 births
1943 deaths
Competitors at the 1935 Maccabiah Games
Jewish military personnel
Jewish swimmers
Maccabiah Games competitors for Poland
Maccabiah Games swimmers
Military personnel from Warsaw
Olympic swimmers of Poland
People from Warsaw Governorate
People who died in Majdanek concentration camp
Polish civilians killed in World War II
Polish Jews who died in the Holocaust
Polish male freestyle swimmers
Polish military personnel of World War II
Swimmers at the 1936 Summer Olympics
Swimmers from Warsaw
Warsaw Ghetto Uprising insurgents